Oscar Righetti (born September 17, 1948 in Peschiera del Garda) is a retired Italian professional footballer who played as a defender.

Honours
Inter
 Serie A champion: 1970–71.

References

1948 births
Living people
Italian footballers
Serie A players
S.P.A.L. players
Inter Milan players
Piacenza Calcio 1919 players
F.C. Crotone players
Association football defenders